Jin Seon-kyu (born September 13, 1977) is a South Korean actor. He is best known for his roles on the big screen, such as The Outlaws (2017) and Extreme Job (2019). He won Best Supporting Actor award at the 38th Blue Dragon Film Awards in 2017 for his performance in the film The Outlaws.

Filmography

Film

Television series

Web series

Television shows

Ambassadorship 
 KRX Gold Market Ambassador (2019–present)
 President of the Alumni Association of Korea National University of Arts

Awards and nominations

State honors

Notes

References

External links
 
 
 

1977 births
Living people
21st-century South Korean male actors
South Korean male television actors
South Korean male film actors
South Korean male stage actors
South Korean male musical theatre actors
Korea National University of Arts alumni